Magda Kalomoirou (born 7 September 1979) is a Greek alpine skier. She competed in two events at the 2006 Winter Olympics.

References

1979 births
Living people
Greek female alpine skiers
Olympic alpine skiers of Greece
Alpine skiers at the 2006 Winter Olympics
Sportspeople from Thessaloniki